is a railway station in Katsuragi, Nara Prefecture, Japan.

Line
Kintetsu Minami Osaka Line

Layout
Taimadera Station has two four-car length side platforms serving a track each. The entrance is located in the south-east side of Abenobashi-bound platform and the platforms are connected by train crossings.

Platforms

Surroundings
 Taima-dera - sightseeing spot for peony
 Katsuragi City Hall Taima Office (former Taima Town Office)
 Katsuragi City Sumo Museum Kehayaza

Adjacent stations

Express trains stop at this station and adjacent Nijō-jinjaguchi Station during the peony season in spring.

Railway stations in Japan opened in 1929
Railway stations in Nara Prefecture